The chacoan gracile opossum (Cryptonanus chacoensis) is a species of opossum in the family Didelphidae. It is native to Argentina, Brazil and Paraguay.  Its habitat is seasonally flooded grasslands and forests in and near the Gran Chaco.

References

Opossums
Marsupials of South America
Marsupials of Argentina
Mammals of Brazil
Mammals of Paraguay
Gran Chaco
Mammals described in 1931